Anthony Bowens (born December 18, 1990) is an American professional wrestler, currently signed to All Elite Wrestling (AEW) where he teams with Max Caster as The Acclaimed. They are former one-time AEW World Tag Team Champions.

Early life
Bowens was born in Nutley, New Jersey. He attended Nutley High School and Montclair State University. He played baseball "for eleven years", including at Montclair State and Seton Hall University, playing two seasons each for the Pirates and Red Hawks. He was discovered by professional wrestler Santino Marella, who asked him whether he had ever thought about professional wrestling. He went on to train under Pat Buck.

Professional wrestling career
Bowens started training in 2012 and made his professional wrestling debut in 2013. In November 2016, he suffered a concussion during a match on WWE NXT.

Once back from injury, Bowens would work prolifically for tristate and New England independent wrestling promotions like Combat Zone Wrestling and Beyond Wrestling while also making appearances for Global Force Wrestling and Total Nonstop Action Wrestling. He captured the WrestlePro Heavyweight Championship twice between 2016 and 2017. On January 21, 2017, Bowens challenged Drew Galloway unsuccessfully for the WCPW World Heavyweight Championship at Battle Club Pro's Fight Forever event, which marked the first time the title had been defended outside of the UK.

In November 2020, All Elite Wrestling President Tony Khan announced that Bowens, alongside Max Caster, had been signed to a five-year contract with the promotion. The announcement also stated that Bowens and Caster would compete as a tag team named The Acclaimed. In May 2022, Bowens underwent knee surgery, sidelining him for several months. During this time Bowens still attended AEW shows and performed his regular promos, although did not wrestle and was confined to a wheelchair; Caster would subsequently team increasingly with the Gunns, with whom they had forged an alliance. Bowens returned from injury at the Blood and Guts edition of Dynamite.

At AEW Grand Slam 2022, The Acclaimed would win their first AEW tag team championship. This made Bowens the first openly gay wrestler to become an AEW champion.

Personal life
Bowens is openly gay. He is a fan of the San Francisco Giants, and previously worked in the production department of the MLB Network studio.

Championships and accomplishments
All Elite Wrestling
AEW World Tag Team Championship (1 time) - with Max Caster
Battle Club Pro
BCP Franchise Championship (1 time)
Independent Wrestling Federation
IWF Junior Heavyweight Championship (1 time)
Pro Wrestling Illustrated
Ranked No. 304 of the top 500 singles wrestlers in the PWI 500 in 2021
WrestlePro
WrestlePro Gold Championship (3 times, current)
Dream 16 (2019)

References

External links
 
 Montclair State bio
 

1990 births
Living people
AEW World Tag Team Champions
African-American male professional wrestlers
All Elite Wrestling personnel
American male professional wrestlers
American YouTubers
Gay sportsmen
LGBT people from New Jersey
LGBT professional wrestlers
American LGBT sportspeople
Montclair State Red Hawks baseball players
Montclair State University alumni
Nutley High School alumni
People from Nutley, New Jersey
Professional wrestlers from New Jersey
Seton Hall Pirates baseball players
Sportspeople from Essex County, New Jersey
21st-century African-American sportspeople
21st-century American LGBT people
LGBT baseball players
21st-century professional wrestlers